Brookville is a small city in northwestern Montgomery County, Ohio, United States. It is a suburb of Dayton. The population was 5,884 at the 2010 census, an increase from 5,289 in 2000. It is part of the Dayton Metropolitan Statistical Area.

History 

Brookville had its first pioneers around 1814.  Brookville was platted in 1850, and named for a small brook near the town site.

Geography

Demographics

2010 census
As of the census of 2010, there were 5,884 people, 2,508 households, and 1,626 families living in the city. The racial makeup of the city was 97.6% White, 0.4% African American, 0.1% Native American, 0.9% Asian, 0.3% from other races, and 0.7% from two or more races. Hispanic or Latino of any race were 0.7% of the population.

There were 2,508 households, of which 30.5% had children under the age of 18 living with them, 48.0% were married couples living together, 12.5% had a female householder with no husband present, 4.4% had a male householder with no wife present, and 35.2% were non-families. 31.3% of all households were made up of individuals, and 17% had someone living alone who was 65 years of age or older. The average household size was 2.29 and the average family size was 2.85.

The median age in the city was 42.3 years. 23.3% of residents were under the age of 18; 7.7% were between the ages of 18 and 24; 22.3% were from 25 to 44; 24.7% were from 45 to 64; and 22.2% were 65 years of age or older. The gender makeup of the city was 46.2% male and 53.8% female. The median household income for a family is $60,988.

2000 census
As of the census of 2000, there were 5,289 people, 2,204 households, and 1,463 families living in the city. The population density was 1,570.6 people per square mile (606.0/km2). There were 2,326 housing units at an average density of 690.7 per square mile (266.5/km2). The racial makeup of the city was 98.71% White, 0.08% African American, 0.13% Native American, 0.64% Asian, 0.21% from other races, and 0.23% from two or more races. Hispanic or Latino of any race were 0.43% of the population.

There were 2,204 households, out of which 29.4% had children under the age of 18 living with them, 52.9% were married couples living together, 10.1% had a female householder with no husband present, and 33.6% were non-families. 30.4% of all households were made up of individuals, and 15.6% had someone living alone who was 65 years of age or older. The average household size was 2.32 and the average family size was 2.87.

In the city the population was spread out, with 23.3% under the age of 18, 7.1% from 18 to 24, 27.1% from 25 to 44, 21.9% from 45 to 64, and 20.5% who were 65 years of age or older. The median age was 40 years. For every 100 females, there were 87.4 males. For every 100 females age 18 and over, there were 80.6 males.

The median income for a household in the city was $39,583, and the median income for a family was $48,068. Males had a median income of $35,938 versus $24,688 for females. The per capita income for the city was $20,124. About 3.3% of families and 5.3% of the population were below the poverty line, including 7.6% of those under age 18 and 6.6% of those age 65 or over.

Education

Brookville is served by the public schooling district named Brookville Local Schools. The schools consist of Brookville Elementary School, Brookville Intermediate School, and Brookville High School.

Brookville has a public library, a branch of the Dayton Metro Library.

References

External links
 City website

 
Cities in Montgomery County, Ohio
Populated places established in 1832
1850 establishments in Ohio
Populated places established in 1850
Cities in Ohio